Crossing Muddy Waters is singer-songwriter John Hiatt's fifteenth album, released in 2000.  A raw album recorded with no drummer, it was a purely acoustic album that brought elements of bluegrass music into his Americana sound.  It was nominated for a Grammy award in 2001 for Best Contemporary Folk Album.

Track listing
All tracks written by John Hiatt

"Lincoln Town" – 4:03
"Crossing Muddy Waters" – 4:05
"What Do We Do Now" – 2:58
"Only the Song Survives" – 4:00
"Lift Up Every Stone" – 3:15
"Take It Down" – 4:00
"Gone" – 2:57
"Take It Back" – 3:04
"Mr. Stanley" – 3:33
"God's Golden Eyes" – 2:28
"Before I Go" – 3:34

Personnel
John Hiatt – guitar, vocals, harmonium
Davey Faragher – bass guitar, tambourine, harmony vocals
David Immerglück – slide and 12-string guitar, mandolin, backing vocals
Technical
Justin Niebank – recording, mixing
Georgette Cartwright – creative director
Michael Wilson – cover photography

References

2000 albums
John Hiatt albums
Vanguard Records albums